Rory Patrick Macnamara (2 January 1955 – 17 December 2016) was a non-executive director on the board of Alliance Trust plc. which he joined in 2015. In 1981 Macnamara joined merchant bank Morgan Grenfell where he became deputy chairman and responsible for obtaining the funding for the construction of the Eurotunnel. He was chairman of Izodia, Essenden, and Mecom Group. He was the master of the Grocers' Company.

References 

1955 births
2016 deaths
Bankers from London
English people of Irish descent
Alumni of the University of Oxford
20th-century English businesspeople